The Lost Behrupiya is a 2013 film.

The film won the National Film Award for Best Arts/Cultural Film at the 61st National Film Awards along with the English-Telugu film O Friend, This Waiting!.

References

External links

2013 films
2010s Hindi-language films